Acta Microbiologica et Immunologica Hungarica (AMIH) is a quarterly peer-reviewed scientific journal covering medical microbiology and immunology. It was established in 1954 as Acta Microbiologica Academiae Scientiarum Hungaricae, changing its name to Acta Microbiologica Hungarica in 1983, and obtaining its current title in 1994. The journal is published by Akadémiai Kiadó on behalf of the Hungarian Academy of Sciences. The editor-in-chief is Dóra Szabó (Semmelweis University).

Abstracting and indexing
The journal is abstracted and indexed in the following bibliographic databases:

According to the Journal Citation Reports, the journal has a 2021 impact factor of 2.298.

References

External links

Microbiology journals
Immunology journals
Publications established in 1954
English-language journals
Quarterly journals
Akadémiai Kiadó academic journals